Areca ipot, the Ipot palm, is a species of flowering plant in the family Arecaceae. It is endemic to the Philippines. It is threatened by habitat loss.

References

ipot
Endemic flora of the Philippines
Endangered flora of Asia
Taxa named by Odoardo Beccari
Taxonomy articles created by Polbot